Sikong Shu or Ssü-k'ung Shu (ca. 720 – ca. 790) was a Chinese poet of the Tang dynasty. Three of his poems were included in the popular anthology Three Hundred Tang Poems. Sikong was known as one of the "Ten Poets of Talent of the Dali period" (766–779), which was Emperor Daizong of Tang's third and final regnal period.

Biography 
The year of Sikong Shu's birth is not known. He was a native of what is now Guangping County, of Hebei Province, China. He was moderately successful in his career as a governmental official.

Name 
"Sikong" is a Chinese compound surname.

Poetry
Sikong Shu's poems as collected in Three Hundred Tang Poems were translated by Witter Bynner as:

 "A Farewell to Han Shen at the Yunyang Inn"
 "When Lu Lun my Cousin Comes for the Night"
 "To a Friend Bound North After the Rebellion"

See also
Lu Lun

References

Works cited 
Davis, A. R. (Albert Richard), Editor and Introduction (1970), The Penguin Book of Chinese Verse. (Baltimore: Penguin Books).

External links
  Books of the Quan Tangshi at the Chinese Text Project that include collected poems of Sikong Shu:
 Book 292
 Book 293
 

Three Hundred Tang Poems poets
Year of death unknown
Tang dynasty politicians from Hebei
Politicians from Handan
Poets from Hebei
Year of birth unknown
8th-century Chinese poets